Anthony "Andy" Granatelli (March 18, 1923 – December 29, 2013) was an American businessman, most prominent as the CEO of STP as well as a major figure in automobile racing events.

Granatelli was born in Dallas, Texas.  Along with his brothers Vince and Joe, he first worked as an auto mechanic and "speed-shop" entrepreneur, modifying engines such as the flathead Ford into racing-quality equipment.  During World War II, he became a promoter of automobile racing events, such as the "Hurricane Racing Association", which combined racing opportunities for up-and-coming drivers with crowd-pleasing theatrics. Hurricane events, according to Granatelli in his autobiography They Call Me Mister 500, included drivers who were experts at executing—and surviving—roll-over and end-over-end crashes, and also an ambulance that not only got caught up into the race but also ejected a stretcher (with a dummy on it) into the way of the racers.

Professional career
In 1946, the three brothers entered the first of several Indianapolis 500 races, as the Grancor racing team.  They did their own mechanical work, and brought innovations like fully independent suspension, yet never made it to "Victory Lane".  In 1948, Andy decided to try to qualify as a driver, and nearly did so, but a horrendous crash during his qualifying run ended that part of his career.

Granatelli eventually became visible in the racing world in the 1960s as the spokesman for STP oil and gasoline treatment products, appearing on its television and radio advertisements as well as sponsoring race cars.  He clad his pit crews in white coveralls with the oval STP logo scattered all over them, and once wore a suit jacket with the same STP-laden design.
He made a cameo appearance in the 1968 Disney movie The Love Bug.

Granatelli's cars became a significant presence at the Indianapolis 500. While he first gained notoriety by re-introducing the Novi engine, his best known entries were his turbine-powered cars in 1967 and 1968. In both years, he saw probable race-winners fail near the end; Joe Leonard's breakdown in the Lotus 56 with 10 laps remaining in 1968 had been topped the previous year when Parnelli Jones, leading comfortably with just three laps to go, suffered the failure of a six dollar transmission bearing in the STP-Paxton Turbocar and retired, handing a sure victory to A. J. Foyt.

He was awarded as an Indianapolis 500 winner in 1969. After his innovative Lotus four-wheel drive car was destroyed in practice upon establishing itself as one of the most dominants cars to date, his driver Mario Andretti, nursing the burns from the Lotus crash, won at the wheel of a year-old backup car.  Before Andretti could be traditionally kissed in "Victory Lane" by the Queen of the "500 Festival", Granatelli got there first, and his joyful kiss on Andretti's cheek is one of the 500's most memorable images. However rumor is that the kiss began the infamous Indianapolis 500 curse that is named for Mario Andretti's family.

In 1973, Granatelli retired his USAC team, and STP became a sponsor of Patrick Racing. Gordon Johncock won the 1973 and 1982 Indianapolis 500 for the brand.

It was believed that Granatelli attended every Indianapolis 500, whether as a participant or as a spectator, from 1946–2012. He did not attend the race in 2013, and died later that year.

Business ventures
Granatelli bought Tuneup Masters in 1976 for $300,000. He sold it for $60 million in 1986.

Awards
He was inducted into the International Motorsports Hall of Fame in 1992 and the Motorsports Hall of Fame of America in 2001. Granatelli was inducted in the National Sprint Car Hall of Fame in 2011 and the National Midget Auto Racing Hall of Fame in 2013.

Death
Granatelli died from congestive heart failure at the age of 90 in Santa Barbara, California.

Related reading 
Anthony (Andy) Granatelli They Call Me Mister 500. 1969

Filmography

References

External links
 Mathews, Barbara E. "Profile of a Phenomenon," American National Business Hall of Fame. 
 Ottum, Bob. "I've Got The Car Right Here," Sports Illustrated, May 13, 1968.
 Caraviello, David. "Legacy of 'Mr. 500' rides again with the No. 43," NASCAR.COM, — June 4, 2011.

1923 births
2013 deaths
International Motorsports Hall of Fame inductees
Businesspeople from Chicago
Bonneville 200 MPH Club members
Racing drivers from Dallas
American people of Italian descent
Formula One team owners
20th-century American businesspeople
IndyCar Series team owners